The 2018 CONCACAF Women's Championship qualification is a women's football competition which decides the participating teams of the 2018 CONCACAF Women's Championship.

A total of eight teams played in the final tournament, which was held in the United States.

Teams
A total of 30 (out of 41) CONCACAF member national teams entered, with three automatic qualifiers, and the remaining 27 teams entering regional qualification tournaments.

FIFA Women's World Rankings in March 2018 in parentheses (NR=Not ranked; N/A=Not applicable as they are not a FIFA member).

Notes
Teams in bold qualified for the final tournament.

Notes

Format
In each group of all rounds, teams played each other once at a centralised venue.
Central American Zone: The top two teams of the group qualify for the final tournament.
Caribbean Zone: The winners of each first round group advance to the final round. The top three teams of the final round qualify for the final tournament.

Tiebreakers
Teams are ranked according to points (3 points for a win, 1 point for a draw, 0 points for a loss). The rankings of teams in each group are determined as follows (regulations Articles 12.4 and 12.7):

If two or more teams are equal on the basis of the above three criteria, their rankings are determined as follows:

Schedule
The schedule of the qualifying rounds was as follows.

Central American Zone

In the Central American Zone, four UNCAF member national teams entered the qualifying competition. The four teams were placed into one group, with the top two teams qualifying for the final tournament as the UNCAF representatives.

The qualifying competition was originally scheduled to take place in Nicaragua, but a new host was selected due to security concerns caused by civil unrest in Nicaragua. In July 2018, CONCACAF announced that all games would be played at the IMG Academy in Bradenton, Florida, United States.

All times local, UTC−4.

Caribbean Zone

In the Caribbean Zone, 23 CFU member national teams entered the qualifying competition, consisting of two stages. All teams entered the first round, and were drawn into three groups of five teams and two groups of four teams. The winners of each group advanced to the final round, where they were placed into one group, with the top three teams qualifying for the final tournament as the CFU representatives.

The draw of the qualifying competition was held on 27 March 2018, 12:00 UTC−4, at the CONCACAF headquarters in Miami Beach, Florida. Dominican Republic, Haiti, Trinidad and Tobago, Antigua and Barbuda, and Guyana were automatically seeded in Groups A–E respectively as hosts of each first round group, while the remaining 18 teams were seeded based on CONCACAF's own ranking.

First round
All times local, UTC−4.

Group A

Group B

Group C

Group D

Group E

Final round
CONCACAF announced on 7 June 2018 that Jamaica would host the final round.

All times local, UTC−5.

Qualified teams
The following eight teams qualified for the final tournament.

1 Bold indicates champions for that year. Italic indicates hosts for that year.

Goalscorers

Notes

References

External links
World Cup Qualifying – Women, CONCACAF.com

Qualification
2018 in women's association football
Women's Championship qualification
2018
May 2018 sports events in North America
August 2018 sports events in North America
September 2018 sports events in North America
Jamaica at the 2019 FIFA Women's World Cup